Aleksandr Frantsev (born 28 June 1997) is a Belarusian professional footballer who plays for Naftan Novopolotsk.

References

External links 
 
 

1997 births
Living people
Sportspeople from Vitebsk Region
Belarusian footballers
Association football midfielders
FC Naftan Novopolotsk players
FC Smorgon players